The Appenninica is a modern breed of sheep from the central Apennine mountains of Italy. It is raised principally in Tuscany and Umbria, but also in Abruzzo, Emilia–Romagna, Lazio, the Marche and Campania. The breed was created in the 1970s by cross-breeding and subsequent selection of local breeds such as the Bariscianese, the Casentinese, the Chietina Varzese, the Pagliarola, the Perugina del piano, the Pomarancina, the Senese delle Creti and the Vissana with Bergamasca rams and with the French Ile-de-France and Berrichon du Cher, with the aim of increasing the meat yield. The breed was recognised in 1980 and a herdbook established in 1981. Although this is a medium-coarse wool breed, it is raised primarily for meat.

It has been used in the development of the Laticauda breed in the Campanian Apennines.

Characteristics
The Appenninica is hornless (polled) in both sexes; the ears are carried horizontally. When mature, ewes weigh on average 56 kg, are 69 cm at the withers and are 73 cm long. The wool has a diameter of 30 to 35 micrometres.

The breed is well adapted to the terrain of the Apennine Mountains, Emilia and Abruzzo regions of Italy.  It is one of the seventeen autochthonous Italian sheep breeds for which a genealogical herdbook is kept by the Associazione Nazionale della Pastorizia, the Italian national association of sheep-breeders. From 1993 to 2007, the population of the Appenninica declined from greater than 160,000 to 3438. In 2013 total numbers for the breed were 9791.

References

Further reading

 R. Bozzi, P. Degl'Innocenti, P. Rivera Diaz, L. Nardi, A. Crovetti, C. Sargentini, A. Giorgetti (July 2009). Genetic characterization and breed assignment in five Italian sheep breeds using microsatellite markers. Small Ruminant Research 85 (1): 50–57. (Abstract;  for full article).
 Emiliano Lasagna, Vincenzo Landi, Matteo Bianchi, Amparo Martínez Martínez, Francesca Maria Sarti (2009). Genetic characterization of Appenninica sheep breed by microsatellites. Italian Journal of Animal Science 8 (2s) (Proceedings of the 18th ASPA Congress, Palermo, 9–12 June 2009): 96–98.
 G. Filippini, F. Aloisio, F. Cecchi, M. Biagetti, F. Macchioni, R. Ciampolini, G. Venditti, E. Ciani, E. Mazzanti, C. Sebastiani and D. Cianci (2006). An investigation on the genetic resistance to Parasitical Fauna in Appenninica sheep breed. Proceedings of the 8th World Congress on Genetics Applied to Livestock Production, Belo Horizonte, Minas Gerais, Brazil, 13–18 August 2006: 38–41.
 F. Cecchi, R. Ciampolini, F. Macchioni, M. Biagetti, E. Ciani, G. Filippini, E. Mazzanti, M. Tancredi, P. Papa, and D. Deni (2006). The Genetic resistance to Coccidia in Appenninica sheep. Proceedings of the 8th World Congress on Genetics Applied to Livestock Production, Belo Horizonte, Minas Gerais, Brazil, 13–18 August 2006: 162–165.
 Lancioni H, Di Lorenzo P, Ceccobelli S, Perego UA, Miglio A, Landi V, Antognoni MT, Sarti FM, Lasagna E, Achilli A. (2013 ). Phylogenetic Relationships of Three Italian Merino-Derived Sheep Breeds Evaluated through a Complete Mitogenome Analysis. PLOS One. 8 (9): e73712. doi: 10.1371/journal.pone.0073712.

Sheep breeds
Sheep breeds originating in Italy